The 7AK7 is a pentode  vacuum tube (thermionic valve).  According to its manufacturer, Sylvania, it was "designed for service in electronic computers".

The tube was developed in 1948, designed at the request of L. D. Wilson for use in the Whirlwind computer.
Significant attention was directed towards its manufacturing process in order to ensure the part's
reliability. Dubbed the "computer tube", it became the standard tube for all computers into the late 1950s.

See also
 25L6, another type of tube found in early computers

References

Vacuum tubes